

Season 
In 1985-86, Hellas Verona came into a disappointing season: it failed the attempt to retain his domestic title, coming just at tenth place.

Due to historical win of Scudetto, attained in previous season, Hellas also took part in European Cup. However, the hopes of a respectable result were lost in the second round: Hellas met Juventus, reigning champion. The first leg resulted in a goalless draw: the second, played in Turin, ended in Juventus' win (2-0) who reached quarter-finals.

Squad

Goalkeepers
  Giuliano Giuliani
  Sergio Spuri

Defenders
  Hans-Peter Briegel
  Mauro Ferroni
  Silvano Fontolan
  Gianluigi Galbagini
  Federico Giolo
  Fabio Marangon
  Roberto Tricella

Midfielders
  Luciano Bruni
  Antonio Di Gennaro
  Mauro Roberto
  Luigi Sacchetti
  Antonio Terraciano
  Vinicio Verza
  Beniamino Vignola
  Domenico Volpati

Attackers
  Giuseppe Galderisi
  Preben Elkjær
  Franco Turchetta
  Rudy Baratto

Competitions

Serie A

League table

Matches

Topscorers
  Preben Elkjær 9
  Giuseppe Galderisi 6
  Vinicio Verza 3

European Cup 

First round

Eightfinals

Coppa Italia 

First round 

Eightfinals

Quarterfinals

References

Sources
  RSSSF - Italy 1985/86

Hellas Verona F.C. seasons
Verona